Suzanne Cooper (1916-1992) was a British Modernist painter and wood-engraver. Her 1936 oil painting "Royal Albion," at the Auckland Art Gallery (NZ), is noted for the "artist's use of simplified blocks of form and colour." She grew up in Frinton-on-Sea and studied at the Grosvenor School of Modern Art in London.  Between 1935 and 1939, she exhibited her oil-paintings and wood-engravings at the Redfern Gallery, the Zwemmer Gallery, the Wertheim Gallery and the Stafford Gallery, and with the National Society of Painters, Sculptors & Print-Makers and the Society of Women Artists.  The influential collector Lucy Wertheim, in addition to exhibiting her work, bought two of Cooper's oil paintings.

Exhibitions 

 "Suzanne Cooper:  The Rediscovery of a Forgotten Artist," 17–25 March 2018, The Fry Art Gallery Too, Saffron Walden (solo exhibition)
 "Suzanne Cooper and the art of wood engraving," 2 June - 1 July 2018, Printroom Studio, Suffolk (group exhibition)
'Suzanne Cooper'  1–7 April 2019 - The Morley Gallery, London  (solo exhibition)

References 

1916 births
1992 deaths
20th-century English painters
English women painters
20th-century British women artists
English wood engravers
20th-century British printmakers
Women engravers
20th-century English women
20th-century engravers